Trichostema simulatum is a species of flowering plant in the mint family known by the common name Siskiyou bluecurls.

It is found n the western United States, where it is native to the southern Cascade Range in northern California and southern Oregon, and in the northern Sierra Nevada of California.

Description

Its aromatic foliage is coated in long and short glandular and nonglandular hairs. The lance-shaped leaves are 2 to 5 centimeters long.

The inflorescence is a long cyme of flowers growing from the stem between each leaf pair. Each flower has a hairy calyx of sepals with triangular points and a tubular, lipped purple corolla. The four protruding stamens are curved.

References

External links
Calflora Database: Trichostema simulatum (Siskiyou bluecurls)
Jepson Manual eFlora (TJM2) treatment of Trichostema simulatum
UC Photos gallery: Trichostema simulatum

simulatum
Flora of California
Flora of Oregon
Flora of the Cascade Range
Flora of the Sierra Nevada (United States)
Endemic flora of the United States
Taxa named by Willis Linn Jepson
Flora without expected TNC conservation status